Jessica Shirley Madsen (born 11 April 1992) is an English actress. She is known for her roles as Clarice in the horror film Leatherface (2017) and Cressida Cowper in the Netflix period drama Bridgerton (2020–).

Early life and education
Madsen was born in London to Jens Madsen and Julia Timewell and grew up in Surrey. Timewell, an artist, was born in what is now Zimbabwe and grew up in South Africa. Madsen's maternal great great aunt was the English writer Dorothy Whipple. She is of Danish descent on her father's side. She attended Notre Dame Preparatory School in Cobham for her primary education. She trained at the Guildhall School of Music and Drama, graduating in 2013.

Filmography

Film

Television

Video games

Stage

References

External links

Living people
1992 births
Actresses from London
Actresses from Surrey
Alumni of the Guildhall School of Music and Drama
English people of Danish descent
English people of South African descent
English people of Zimbabwean descent
People educated at Notre Dame School, Surrey
People from the City of Westminster